Phase One Endurance is a motorcycle endurance team, currently competing in the FIM Endurance World Championship.  They were formed in 1985 by Russell Benney and Martin Prout. They won the Endurance World Championship title in 1993, 2000, and 2003.

2008 season
Phase One Endurance secured 10th place in their class at the 24 Hours of Le Man's race after a lot of turmoil and 2 crashes during the night. From starting in 15th, they worked their way up through the field to 3rd before riders James Haydon and James McBride both crashed during the night. After losing a lot of time the team managed to get back up to 10th place in their class again before the end.

After a poor start to the season, Phase One Endurance achieved 4th place in both the Oschersleben 8hr race, and the Bol D'or 24hr race in which they came 8th overall. At the last race of the year in Qatar they were fighting for the lead, with rider Glen Richards on board, when a crash forced a long push-in from Glen Richards which pushed them down to dead last. They eventually finished this race 9th in their class.

2009 season
Phase One is using 2009 Yamaha YZF-R1s ridden by Pedro Vallcanaras, Damian Cudlin, and Alex Cudlin.

References

Further reading

External links
 phaseone.co.uk Official website

Motorcycle racing teams
Motorcycle racing teams established in 1985
1985 establishments in the United Kingdom